Nadir Rashid oghlu Rustamli (born 8 July 1999) is an Azerbaijani singer. Rustamli won the second season of The Voice of Azerbaijan. He represented Azerbaijan in the Eurovision Song Contest 2022 with the song "Fade To Black", finishing 16th in the final.

Early life 
Born in Salyan, Rustamli attended secondary school #3 in 2005–2016. In his younger years, he received piano training at the Gulu Asgarov Music School in his hometown. In 2021, Rustamli graduated from the Azerbaijan University of Tourism and Management with a degree in business administration.

Career

2017–2020 
From 2017 onwards, Rustamli has participated in various contests, including the Youthvision 2019 International Song Contest, where he finished second among 21 contestants.

2021: The Voice of Azerbaijan 
In 2021, he auditioned for the second season of The Voice of Azerbaijan. In the blind auditions, he earned chair turns from Eldar Gasimov and Murad Arif. He chose to be on Team Eldar. In January 2022, he won the show with a televote percentage of 42.6%.

2022: Eurovision Song Contest 2022 

On 16 February 2022, İctimai Television announced that they had internally selected Rustamli to represent Azerbaijan in the Eurovision Song Contest 2022. He came 10th in the second semi-final with 96 points, qualifying for the final. All of the points came from jury votes, with the public vote not awarding any points. Rustamli performed 15th in the grand final, and came 16th with 106 points; 103 points came from the jury, and 3 from the public.

Discography

Singles 

 "Mashup" (2021)
 "Fade to Black" (2022)

References

External links 
 
 

1999 births
Living people
21st-century Azerbaijani singers
The Voice (franchise) winners
Eurovision Song Contest entrants for Azerbaijan
Eurovision Song Contest entrants of 2022
People from Salyan, Azerbaijan
People from Salyan District (Azerbaijan)